Breakaway or Break Away may refer to:

Film, television and radio
 Breakaway (1955 film), a British film
 Breakaway (1990 film), an Australian film featuring Deborah Kara Unger
 Breakaway (1996 film), an American film featuring Tonya Harding
 Breakaway (2003 film), a film starring Dean Cain
 Breakaway (2011 film), a Canadian film
 Breakaway (game show), a British game show presented by Nick Hancock
 "Breakaway" (Space: 1999), the opening episode of the British TV series Space: 1999
 Breakaway (TV series), an English TV series written by Francis Durbridge
 Breakaway PPV, a Canadian pay-per-view television provider
 Breakaway (radio programme), a British travel programme on BBC Radio 4

Sports
 Breakaway (cycling), a cycling term for a single rider or group of riders detaching from the peloton to advance their position in front of it
 Breakaway (ice hockey), a situation in which there are no defenders (except for the goaltender) between an attacking player and the goal
 Breakaway (rugby union) or flanker, a position in rugby union
 Breakaway rim, a type of basketball hoop
 Breakaway roping, a rodeo event

Video gaming
 Breakaway (2010 video game), a soccer video game
 Breakaway (cancelled video game), a cancelled video game produced by Amazon Game Studios
 BreakAway Games, an American video game developer

Music
 The Breakaways, an English female vocal trio
 Breakaway music, a U.S. Naval tradition

Albums
 Breakaway (Art Garfunkel album), 1975, and the title song, "Break Away" (see below)
 Breakaway (First Choice album), 1980
 Breakaway (Gallagher and Lyle album), 1976, and the title song (see below)
 Breakaway (Kelly Clarkson album), 2004, and the title song (see below)
 Breakaway (Kim Appleby album), 1993
 Breakaway (Kris Kristofferson album), a 1974 duet album by Kristofferson and Rita Coolidge
 Breakaway, a 1991 release by the Pasadena Roof Orchestra

Songs
 "Breakaway", by The Springfields, 1961
 "Break Away" (Art Garfunkel song), also recorded by its writers, Gallagher and Lyle
 "Break Away" (The Beach Boys song), 1969
 "Breakaway" (Big Pig song), 1988
 "Breakaway" (Donna Summer song), 1989
 "Break Away" (Gail Davies song), 1985
 "Breakaway" (Irma Thomas song), notably covered by Tracey Ullman
 "Break Away" (Ivy Quainoo song), covered in 2013 by Celine Dion as "Breakaway"
 "Breakaway" (Kelly Clarkson song), 2004
 "Break Away (from That Boy)", a 1965 song by The Newbeats
 "Breakaway", by Alan Parsons, from the album Try Anything Once
 "Breakaway", by Basement Jaxx, from the album Rooty
 "Breakaway", by Bruce Springsteen, from the album The Promise
 "Breakaway", by Candlebox, from the album Happy Pills
 "Breakaway", by The Cars, from the album Why Can't I Have You
 "Breakaway", by Con Conrad, Archie Gottler, and Sidney D. Mitchell, originally from the film Fox Movietone Follies of 1929
 "Breakaway", by George Ezra, from the album Wanted on Voyage
 "Break Away", by Gotthard, from the album Need to Believe
 "Break Away", by Staind, from the album The Illusion of Progress
 "Break Away", by Sturm und Drang, from the album Rock 'n Roll Children
 "Break Away", by Subdigitals, used in the end credits of the show Code Lyoko
 "Breakaway", by Tinchy Stryder, from the album Star in the Hood
 "Break Away", by Tokio Hotel, from the album Scream
 "Breakaway", by Tori Amos, from the album Native Invader
 "Breakaway", by ZZ Top, from the album Antenna

Other uses
 Breakaway (biscuit), a chocolate bar produced by Nestlé
 Breakaway friction, or stiction, the threshold of force required to overcome static cohesion
 Breakaway (FIRST), the game in the 2010 FIRST Robotics Competition
 A break away!, an 1891 painting by Australian artist Tom Roberts
 Breakaway (dance), a 1920s dance style
 Break Away (organization), nonprofit organization that promotes the development of quality alternative break programs
 Breakaway Airport, an airport located in Cedar Park, Texas
 Breakaway (Transformers), a fictional character in the Transformers universe
Breakaway, Queensland, a suburb of Mount Isa, Australia
 Breakaway object, a type of theatrical property
 Breakaway vase, a vase that is fake

See also
 Breaking Away (disambiguation)
 Norwegian Breakaway, a 2011 cruise ship operated by Norwegian Cruise Line
 Crevasse wall breakaway, in glaciology, an informal classification that can result from ice calving
 Secession